Bob Bryan and Mike Bryan were the two-time defending champions, but lost in the quarterfinals to Vasek Pospisil and Jack Sock.
Pospisil and Sock went on to win the title, defeating Simone Bolelli and Fabio Fognini in the final, 6–4, 6–7(3–7), [10–7].

Seeds

Draw

Finals

Top half

Bottom half

References
 Main Draw

BNP Paribas Open - Men's Doubles
2015 BNP Paribas Open